Mieczysław Kapiak (15 August 1911 – 20 September 1975) was a Polish cyclist. He competed in the individual and team road race events at the 1936 Summer Olympics.

References

1911 births
1975 deaths
Polish male cyclists
Olympic cyclists of Poland
Cyclists at the 1936 Summer Olympics
Cyclists from Warsaw
20th-century Polish people